Onie Wheeler (November 10, 1921 – May 26, 1984) was an American country and bluegrass musician.

Wheeler was born in Senath, Missouri, United States, and learned to play guitar and harmonica as a child. After serving in World War II, he started working in radio, appearing on stations in Missouri, Arkansas, Michigan, and Kentucky. In 1950, he formed The Ozark Cowboys, along with Ernest Thompson, A.J. Nelson and Doyal Nelson.

The Ozark Cowboys went to Nashville in 1953 and signed to Columbia Records. Their initial releases were not hits, though Lefty Frizzell took the Wheeler-penned "Run 'Em Off" to the Top Ten of the U.S. country chart.

Wheeler signed as a solo artist to Sun Records in 1957 and went on tour with Jerry Lee Lewis, Johnny Cash, Elvis Presley, and Carl Perkins. After a short time living in California, he returned to Nashville and recorded for several more labels in the 1960s. Later, he toured with George Jones in the mid-1960s and later that decade with Roy Acuff.

His biggest success was the 1973 hit "John's Been Shucking My Corn," though the achievements of his daughter Karen would eclipse his own in the decade. He bought a guitar shop in Nashville in the late 1970s, and played at the Grand Ole Opry at times with Acuff. Wheeler was onstage playing with Rev. Jimmie Snow in 1984 when he collapsed and died of a heart attack.

Discography

References

External links
[ Onie Wheeler] at AllMusic

1921 births
1984 deaths
American country singer-songwriters
Singer-songwriters from Missouri
Starday Records artists
People from Dunklin County, Missouri
20th-century American singers
Country musicians from Missouri
American military personnel of World War II